Behula is the protagonist in the Shiva Purana and the Manasamangal genre of Assamese and Bengali medieval epics. A number of works belonging to this genre were written between the thirteenth and eighteenth centuries. Though the religious purpose of these works is to eulogise the Hindu goddess Manasa, these works are more well known for depicting the love story of Behula and her husband Lakhindar (or Lakshindar or Lakshmindara).

Story from Shiva puran
Usha, the daughter of Banasura, fell in love with Aniruddha the son of Pradyumna. Aniruddha was a grandson of lord Krishna. After their marriage they were reborn again as Behula and Lakshindar in next life and married each other again.

Behula was the daughter-in law of Chand Sadagar of Champaknagar. According to myth, two beautiful apsara's of the kingdom of heaven, Usha and Aniruddha were cursed by Gods as per the plan of Goddess Manasa and sent to earth as Behula and Lakshinder - Behula as the only daughter of Say bene (or Sayven of Ujaninagar) and Lakshinder as the seventh son of Chand Sadagar.

Chand sadagar was a great devotee of Shiva and for certain reasons he hated Manasa. But Manasa had to get "Anjali" by Chand sadagar's right hand- the Bhaktasreshto to get position of Goddess in the heaven. However, Chand sadagar promised to himself that he will never give Anjali to Manasa by the hand he uses to give anjali to Shiva. To get an anjali from Chand, Manasa took away his six sons. They died from poisonous snake bites and Manasa had absolute power over all snakes. These deaths infuriated Chand Sadagar even more and he vowed to save his last son, Lakhinder, in any way possible. Chand found a girl, Behula, whose destiny spoke that she will never be a widow. Chand got his seventh son, Lakshinder married with Behula. Chand also had an iron palace built without any hole so that not a single snake could enter the house.

Bishyakarma made it for the wedding night of Behula and Lakshinder. But due to the request of Manasa, Bishyakarma kept a hole in the palace. The night came and Manasa sent her Kalnagini, the most poisonous snake, to the iron palace and it crept into the room. Behula fell asleep due to a spell Manasa cast on her. When Kalnagini was going to bite Lakshinder, she saw that Behula had committed no sin for which she might be given such a harsh punishment. So kalnagini, with the help of the lower end of her body smeared the parting of Behula's hair with the oil of the lamp, which was a sin according to the Hindu mythology. After she bit Lakshinder, Lakshinder shouted aloud. Behula woke up and saw kalnagini slithering out of the room. In anger, she threw the jaanti towards kalnagini and the lower part of the snake's body was cut off. Kalnagini was not eager to bite Lakshinder; Manasa forced her to do so.

To get back her husband's life from the Gods in the heavens, Behula sailed with her dead husband in a raft towards Heaven. She faced many dangers during her incredibly long and difficult journey in the rivers. After reaching Heaven, she pleased all the Gods with her beautiful and enchanting dancing and got the Gods to promise to give back her husband's life on the condition that Chand would give anjali to Manasa. Desperate to save his son's life, finally Chand gave in and gave the anjali by the left hand. Consequentlty Manasa got the position of Goddess in heaven and gave back the life of all the six sons of Chand.

Another version
Having returned to Champak Nagar, Chand Sadagar managed to rebuild his life. A son was born to him. They named the boy Lakshmindara. At around the same time Saha's wife gave birth to a daughter, whom they named Behula. Both the children grew up together and were a perfect made-for-each-other, but when their horoscopes were tallied, it was predicted that Lakshmindara would die of snake-bite on the wedding night. However, as both the children were already devotees of Manasa and were so well matched that the marriage went through. Chand Sadagar took extra precaution in building a new bridal chamber that snakes could not penetrate.

In spite of all the precautions, Manasa had her way. One of the snakes, sent by her, killed Lakshmindara. It was the custom that anyone who died of snake-bite was not cremated in the usual way but was allowed to float on a raft down the river, with the hope that the person could miraculously come back to life. Behula insisted on accompanying her dead husband on the raft ignoring all the pleas of others not to do so. They sailed for six months, passing village after village, the corpse began to decompose, the villagers thought of her as a mad person. She kept on praying to Manasa. All that the latter did was to protect the raft from sinking.

The raft arrived at the place where Neta, Manasa's foster mother stayed. She worked as a washer woman and was on the river bank when the raft touched land. Hearing Behula's perpetual prayers to Manasa, she decided to take her to Manasa. Using her supernatural powers, Neta whisked Behula and the dead Lakshmindara to heaven. Manasa said, "You deserve to have him back, but this can only be done if you promise to convert your father-in-law to my worship."

“I will,” said Behula, and immediately life started to stir the corpse of her dead husband. His decayed flesh healed, he opened his eyes. He smiled at Behula.

With Neta as their guide they returned to earth. Behula met her mother-in-law and narrated all that happened. She went and told Chand Sadagar about it. He could not say no to worshipping Manasa, but he did not worship her with his right hand, as he was devoted already to Shiva. So instead he gave "Anjali" to the goddess by his left hand.

Legacy
Behula continues to fascinate the peoples minds in Assam, Bengal, Bangladesh and West Bengal. She is often seen as the archetypal wife, full of love and courage. This image of Behula is reflected in one of the poems of Jibanananda Das. Behula is regarded as the epitome of a loving and loyal wife in the Bengali and the Kamarupi culture.

In 2021, the Bangladeshi rock band Shunno released a folk-rock ballad called ‘Behula’ that was inspired by this story. The lyric was penned by Tanvir Chowdhury.

References

External links
 

Bengali folklore
Characters in Hindu mythology